Ukrainian Marketing Association is a Ukrainian non-governmental professional development and industry standards organization for marketing and sociological research companies established in Ukraine.

Membership

All-Ukrainian public organization UMA has two types of membership: Individual and collective.
 Individual members : market specialists and managers of different branches of industry, managers and experts of marketing research agencies, lecturers of the marketing departments in the education institutions.
 Collective members : marketing and consulting agencies, advertisement companies, educational establishments, firms which develop software for market specialists, enterprises of different field of national economy.

A list of affiliated organizations includes:
 Research & Branding Group (Ukraine)

Publications
The Ukrainian Marketing Association publishes an online subscription Marketing Industry Newspaper and an annual report on its activities and membership.

References

External links
 

Trade associations based in Ukraine
Professional associations based in Ukraine
Marketing organizations